The Priacanthidae, the bigeyes, are a family of 18 species of marine ray-finned fishes. "Catalufa" is an alternate common name for some members of the Priacanthidae. The etymology of the scientific name (to bite + , thorn) refers to the family's very rough, spined scales. The common name of "bigeye" refers to the member species' unusually large eyes, suited to their carnivorous and nocturnal lifestyles. Priacanthidae are typically colored bright red, but some have patterns in silver, dusky brown, or black.

Most members of this family are native to tropical and subtropical parts of the Indian and Pacific Oceans, but four species (Cookeolus japonicus, Heteropriacanthus cruentatus, Priacanthus arenatus, and Pristigenys alta) are found in the Atlantic. They tend to live near rock outcroppings or reefs, although a few are known to inhabit open waters. Many species are found in relatively deep waters, below depths reachable by normal scuba diving. Some species are fished for food.

The earliest identified Priacanthidae fossils date to the middle Eocene epoch of the lower Tertiary period, or roughly 40 to 50 million years ago.

Species

The 18 species in four genera are:
 Genus Cookeolus Fowler, 1928
Cookeolus japonicus (Cuvier, 1829) - Longfinned bullseye
†Cookeolus spinolacrymatus Kon & Yoshino, 1997
 Genus Heteropriacanthus Fitch & Crooke, 1984
Heteropriacanthus cruentatus (Lacépède, 1801) - Glasseye
 Genus Priacanthus Oken, 1817
Priacanthus alalaua Jordan & Evermann, 1903 - Alalaua
 Priacanthus arenatus Cuvier, 1829 -  Atlantic bigeye
 Priacanthus blochii Bleeker, 1853 - Paeony bulleye
 Priacanthus fitchi Starnes, 1988
 Priacanthus hamrur (Forsskål, 1775) - Moontail bullseye
 Priacanthus macracanthus Cuvier, 1829 - Red bigeye
  Priacanthus meeki Jenkins, 1903 - Hawaiian bigeye
 Priacanthus nasca Starnes, 1988
 Priacanthus prolixus Starnes, 1988 - Elongate bulleye
 Priacanthus sagittarius Starnes, 1988 - Arrow bulleye
 Priacanthus tayenus Richardson, 1846 - Purple-spotted bigeye
 Priacanthus zaiserae Starnes & Moyer, 1988
 † Priacanthus liui  Tao, 1993
 Genus Pristigenys Agassiz 1835
 Pristigenys alta (Gill, 1862) - Short bigeye
 Pristigenys meyeri (Günther, 1872)
 Pristigenys niphonia (Cuvier, 1829) - Japanese bigeye 
 Pristigenys serrula (Gilbert, 1891) - Popeye catalufa
 Pristigenys substriatus (Blainville, 1818)

Timeline of genera

References

External links 

 
Taxa named by Albert Günther
Ray-finned fish families